Meyyanathan Siva V is a Tamilnadu Politician from DMK Party. He has been elected twice from  Alangudi assembly constituency. During last elections in 2021, he won by 25,847 votes and defeated Dharma Thangavel who was from AIADMK. In the current Tamilnadu Ministry, he is the Environment Minister.

References 

Dravida Munnetra Kazhagam politicians
Living people
Year of birth missing (living people)
Place of birth missing (living people)
Tamil Nadu MLAs 2021–2026
Tamil Nadu MLAs 2016–2021